Amphidromus roseolabiatus is a species of air-breathing land snail, a terrestrial pulmonate gastropod mollusk in the family Camaenidae.

Distribution
Distribution of Amphidromus roseolabiatus include central and northern Laos, Nan Province in Thailand and Phong Nha-Kẻ Bàng National Park in Vietnam. Found in Karimganj District, Bazaricherra, Assam, India.

Description

References

 Thach N.N. (2017). New shells of Southeast Asia. Sea shells & Land snails. 48HrBooks Company. 128 pp.
 Thach, N. N. (2018). New shells of South Asia. Seashells-Landsnails-Freshwater Shells. 3 New Genera, 132 New Species & Subspecies. 48HRBooks Company, Akron, Ohio, USA. 173 pp.

External links 
 Fulton H.C. (1896). A list of the species of Amphidromus, Albers, with critical notes and descriptions of some hitherto undescribed species and varieties. The Annals and Magazine of Natural History. ser. 6, 17: 66-94, pls 5-7
 Inkhavilay, K., Sutcharit, C., Bantaowong, U., Chanabun, R., Siriwut, W., Srisonchai, R., Pholyotha, A., Jirapatrasilp, P. & Panha, S. (2019). Annotated checklist of the terrestrial molluscs from Laos (Mollusca, Gastropoda). ZooKeys. 834: 1–166.

roseolabiatus
Gastropods described in 1896